HMCS Radisson is a Canadian Forces Naval Reserve Division (NRD) located on Île Saint-Christophe in Trois-Rivières, Quebec. Dubbed a stone frigate, HMCS Radisson is a land-based naval training establishment crewed by part-time sailors and also serves as a local recruitment centre for the Canadian Forces Naval Reserve. It is one of 24 naval reserve divisions located in major cities across Canada.

Namesake 
HMCS Radisson is named after 17th century explorer Pierre Esprit Radisson, who conducted explorations and participated in the fur trade by canoe from a base in the sandy hills of what is now Three Rivers (Trois-Rivières).

History 
HMCS Radisson was established in 1986 in an effort to expand the presence of the Royal Canadian Navy in Quebec. The NRD was first located at the Trois-Rivières post office and later moved to the former d'Youville School in 1987. In 1992 the unit finally moved to its new facility on Saint-Cristophe Island, where it stands today.

References 

Royal Canadian Naval Reserve
Organizations based in Quebec
Trois-Rivières